The Caproni Ca.308 Borea ("North Wind") was a small airliner built in Italy in the mid-1930s.

Development
The Ca.308 was a streamlined, low-wing cantilevered monoplane design of conventional configuration. Its undercarriage was not retractable. The mainwheels were fitted with spats.

The prototype, designated Ca.306, was exhibited at the Milan Exhibition of 1935.

The basic design of the Ca.308 subsequently served as the basis for a large family of military aircraft, beginning with the Caproni Ca.309.

Operational history
The Italian airline Ala Littoria ordered five examples.

The Italian government ordered two aircraft for general-purpose use by its colonial administration in Libya.

All these aircraft received the Ca.308 designation.

Variants
Ca 306The prototype, exhibited at the Milan Exhibition of 1935.
Ca 308 BoreaProduction aircraft, Seven built.

Operators

 Ala Littoria
 Regia Aeronautica

Aeronautica Militare Italiana

Specifications (Ca.308)

See also

References

 
 
 
 
 Уголок неба

Ca.308
1930s Italian airliners
Low-wing aircraft
Aircraft first flown in 1935
Twin piston-engined tractor aircraft